Gudachi is a rural locality (a settlement) and the administrative center of Gudachinskoye Rural Settlement of Magdagachinsky District, Amur Oblast, Russia. The population was 372 as of 2018. There are 9  streets.

Geography 
Gudachi is located on northwest on the Amur–Zeya Plain, 55 km northwest of Magdagachi (the district's administrative centre) by road. Gonzha is the nearest rural locality.

References 

Rural localities in Magdagachinsky District